Jacolene McLaren (born 15 December 2001) is a South African field hockey player for the South African national team.

She participated at the 2018 Summer Youth Olympics, and 2022 Women's FIH Hockey Junior World Cup.

She attended Hoër Meisieskool Oranje and is currently studying in North-West University.

Honours
North West (Provincial)
 2022 Senior IPT Women - B Section - Player of the Tournament

References

External links

2000 births
Living people
South African female field hockey players
Field hockey players at the 2018 Summer Youth Olympics
Field hockey players at the 2018 African Youth Games
North-West University Hockey Club players
21st-century South African women